Sturge may refer to:

People 
Sturge is a Middle Ages surname of Norse-Viking origins, meaning son of Turgis or Thurgis, Turgeus etc., which meant "Thor's follower".

Surname 
Alfred Sturge (1816–1901), British cleric who ministered in Devon, India and Kent
David Sturge (born 1948), British athlete in rowing
Diana Catherine Sturge, Viscountess Eccles DL (born 1933), British Conservative peer and businesswoman
Edmund Sturge (1808–1893), British Quaker businessman and campaigner for liberal causes
Eliza Sturge (1842–1905), British women rights activist based in Birmingham
Emily Sturge (1847–1892), British campaigner for women's education
Ernest Adolphus Sturge (1856–1934), American missionary, organiser of Japanese Presbyterian churches in California
Hannah Sturge, born Hannah Dickinson, (1816–1896), British Quaker philanthropist
Joseph Sturge (1793–1859), British founder of the British and Foreign Anti-Slavery Society
Mary Sturge (1865–1925), British doctor, known for her pioneering work with alcoholism
Matilda Sturge (1829–1903), British Quaker minister, poet and essayist from Bristol
Michael Sturge (1931–2003), English experimental physicist, worked in solid-state spectroscopy
Sophia Sturge (1849–1936), British Quaker suffragist, social reformer and peace campaigner
Sophia Sturge (abolitionist) (1795–1845), British slavery abolitionist based in Birmingham
Thomas Sturge (1787–1866), British oil merchant, shipowner, cement manufacturer, railway company director, social reformer and philanthropist
Thomas Sturge the elder (1749–1825), London tallow chandler, oil merchant, spermaceti processor and philanthropist
William Allen Sturge (1850–1919), British physician and archaeologist

Given name 
John Sturge Stephens (1891–1954), British conscientious objector and historian
Mary Sturge Gretton, born May Gertrude Sturge (1871–1970), British historian and magistrate
Thomas Sturge Moore (1870–1944), British poet, author and artist
William Sturge Moore (1785–1809), political figure in Lower Canada

Places 
Sturge Island, one of the three main islands in the uninhabited Balleny Islands group in the Southern Ocean
Sturge Park, former cricket ground in Montserrat, destroyed by the volcanic eruption of 1997

See also 
King Sturge, international property consultancy
Sturge–Weber syndrome (encephalotrigeminal angiomatosis), a rare congenital neurological and skin disorder

Germanic-language surnames